The 1984 Lehigh Engineers football team was an American football team that represented Lehigh University as an independent during the 1984 NCAA Division I-AA football season. 

In their ninth year under head coach John Whitehead, the Engineers compiled a 5–6 record. Mike Ellow, Doug Ertz, Tony Semler and Blair Talmadge were the team captains.

Lehigh was briefly ranked in the national Division I-AA top 20, at No. 15 in the poll released September 18, but quickly dropped out of the rankings and remained unranked through season's end.

Lehigh played its home games at Taylor Stadium on the university's main campus in Bethlehem, Pennsylvania.

Schedule

References

Lehigh
Lehigh Mountain Hawks football seasons
Lehigh Engineers football